Naudé may refer to:
 Annelize Naudé (born 1977), Dutch professional squash player
 Beyers Naudé (1915–2004), South African cleric, theologian and the leading Afrikaner
 Elizna Naudé (born 1978), South African discus thrower
 Franco Naudé (born 1996), South African rugby union player
 Gabriel Naudé (1600–1653), French librarian and scholar
 Helmuth Naudé (1904–1943), German modern pentathlete
 Jozua Naudé (pastor) (1873–1948), cofounder of the Afrikaner Broederbond, and father of Beyers Naudé
 Morgan Naudé (born 1998), South African rugby union player
 Peter Naudé (born 1950s), British organizational theorist
 Pieter Hugo Naudé (1869–1941), South African painter
 S. J. Naudé (born 1970), South African author and lawyer
 Tom Naudé (1889–1969), Acting State President of South Africa

See also 
 Naude (disambiguation)

Afrikaans-language surnames
French-language surnames
Surnames of French origin